Karnataka Lions (abbreviated as KL) is a hockey team based in Bangalore, Karnataka, India that plays in the World Series Hockey. The team is led by Indian hockey player Arjun Halappa and coached by former Indian captain Jude Felix. The team is owned by Sporting Ace Pvt. Ltd. (Zentrum Group). Bangalore Hockey Stadium in Bangalore is the home ground of Karnataka Lions.

Karnataka Lions ended-up as the semi-finalists in the inaugural edition of WSH after being knocked out by Sher-e-Punjab in the semi-final. They finished third in the group stage. Team's penalty corner specialist Len Aiyappa was the top scorer for the team and third overall in the season with 13 goals in 12 matches.

History

2012 season
Karnataka Lions had a bad start to the tournament with three consecutive defeats against Delhi Wizards, Sher-e-Punjab and Bhopal Badshahs. Karnataka opened their account against Chandigarh Comets with a 3–1 victory at home. Their next five matches fetched them just two victories and three defeats and were seemed to be out of the tournament as they lied at the bottom of the table. They won four in a row in a must win situation and as a result qualified for the semi-finals with still one of their match remaining. They played Chandigarh Comets in their last league match where they had a big 6–1 defeat.

Karnataka Lions faced Sher-e-Punjab at their home ground, Bangalore Hockey Stadium, in the semi-final. Karnataka was defeated convincingly despite of getting an earlier lead and hence brought their campaign in 2012's season of World Series Hockey to an end. They lost 4–1 from Punjab who went on to the final to become champions. Majority of the team's goals came through their penalty corner specialist Len Aiyappa who scored 13 goals in 12 matches including two hat-tricks against Chandigarh Comets and Bhopal Badshahs.

Franchisee Details

Ownership

Sporting Ace (a part of the Zentrum Group) owns the Karnataka Lions franchisee. Sporting Ace Private Limited is a part of the rapidly growing Zentrum Group and has acclaimed Bollywood action hero Suniel Shetty as the Chief Mentor. Zentrum Group is a global player in the field of Energy, Chemicals, Education, Sports, Information Technology, Consulting, Media, & Outsourcing and work extensively with the world's leading corporate houses, governments, and institutions.

Sponsors and Partners
The Karnataka Lions have managed to rope in XAGE Mobile as their Title & Platinum Sponsor, Nandi Infrastructure Corridor Enterprises Ltd. (NICE) as the Gold Sponsor, Slazenger as their Kit & Equipment partner. Kyazoonga.com is the official ticketing partners and Radio City the radio partners. RVR16 is the Digital Partner who manages the Social Media Marketing, facebook, Twitter, official website and other Digital marketing forms. Fluid Media manages the creative duties for the team and Highlight advertising has been responsible for all on ground activations. Sporting Ace has in-house managed all the media marketing campaign.

Theme Song
Theme song for Karnataka Lions has been composed by National award winning music director Vidyasagar. Lyrics have been written mainly in Kannada with a few words in English and Hindi by Shabbir Ahmed.

Team Composition
The team is captained by experienced Indian striker Arjun Halappa and coached by Jude Felix.

Fixtures and Results

2012

Statistics

See also
World Series Hockey

References

World Series Hockey teams
Sport in Karnataka
2011 establishments in Karnataka